Nicholas Hewetson (12 July 1703 – 29 June 1761) was an 18th-century  Anglican priest in Ireland.

Hewetson was born at Thomastown and educated at Trinity College, Dublin.  He was Archdeacon of Killaloe from 1753  and Treasurer of Kilkenny Cathedral from 1758, holding both positions until his death.

References

Alumni of Trinity College Dublin
18th-century Irish Anglican priests
Archdeacons of Killaloe
1703 births
1761 deaths
People from Thomastown